Finns Point is a small strategic promontory in Pennsville Township, Salem County, New Jersey, and New Castle County, Delaware, located at the southwest corner of the cape of Penns Neck, on the east bank of the Delaware River near its mouth on Delaware Bay. Due to the wording of the original charter defining the boundaries of New Jersey and Delaware, part of the promontory is actually enclosed within the state of Delaware's border, due to tidal flow and the manner in which the borders between New Jersey and Delaware were first laid out. Therefore, this portion of Finns Point is an exclave of Delaware, cut off from the rest of the state by Delaware Bay. Pea Patch Island, part of the state of Delaware, sits in the channel of the river facing the promontory.

17th century
At the time of European colonization in the 17th century the Delaware River was known as the South River and the Salem River was known as Varkens Kill, or Hogg Creek.

Tradition holds that a settlement was first planted by Finns as part of the colony of New Sweden in 1638. among them, the family of Anders Sinicka, whose surname has many variations.

 This is recalled in the name of the road running along the shore south of the Port of Salem, Sinnicksons Landing Road. which bears the name of the a prominent Salem County family, including Thomas Sinnickson and his descendants.

In 1641, a group of 60 settlers (20 families) from the New Haven Colony (in today's Connecticut) purchased land along the kill. In 1643, the Governor of New Sweden built Fort Nya Elfsborg, just east of present-day Salem, New Jersey, and allowed the Varkens Kill settlement to remain if they swore allegiance to Sweden.

In 1651, Fort Casimir was constructed directly across the river on the west bank of the Delaware and by 1655, the region came under the control of New Netherland, which it remained until 1664 when the English overran the  settlements on the south banks of the Delaware. The peninsula on the east banks became West Jersey. The town at Salem was founded in 1675 by John Fenwick, a Quaker.

Military facilities
The promontory is the location of Finns Point National Cemetery, a military cemetery used in the American Civil War for Union and Confederate soldiers who died while at Fort Delaware on Pea Patch Island. It was also the location of Fort Mott, constructed after the Civil War and used up through World War I to protect the E.I. du Pont de Nemours and Company facilities upriver at Carneys Point Township, New Jersey, as well as the port of Philadelphia. The fort is now part of Fort Mott State Park.

See also
Twelve-Mile Circle
Supawna Meadows National Wildlife Refuge

References

External links
 Finnish place name origins
 Channel 6 Action News (Philadelphia) Special Report on Finns Point
 Finns Point National Cemetery
 Fort Mott
 Finnish American History (in Finnish)

Finnish-American culture in New Jersey
Headlands of New Jersey
Landforms of Salem County, New Jersey
Borders of Delaware
Landforms of New Castle County, Delaware
Borders of New Jersey
Peninsulas of New Jersey
Pennsville Township, New Jersey
Exclaves in the United States
Swedish-American history
Finnish-American history
Swedish American culture in New Jersey
New Sweden
17th-century establishments in New Sweden